Scorpio is a studio album by American country singer-songwriter Bill Anderson. It was released in April 1977 on MCA Records and was produced by Buddy Killen. Scorpio was Anderson's 26th studio album as a recording artist and first album release of 1977. Another album would follow later in the year. The project produced two singles that became major hits.

Background and content
Scorpio was the first album project that Buddy Killen produced. By the late 1970s, Anderson had been recording for Decca (now MCA) since 1958 under the direction of producer Owen Bradley. During the later half of the 70s, Killen became more interested in recording Anderson. Killen brought him to the attention of the label, who put him under a contract to record Anderson. The agreement lasted until 1981 when Anderson eventually left the label. The album consisted of ten tracks previously unrecorded by Anderson. Three of these tracks were composed by Anderson himself. Additional tracks were written by other writers, notably Bobby Braddock, who wrote two of the record's songs. Like previous releases, the tracks were recorded at Bradley's Barn in Mount Juliet, Tennessee. The sessions took place in November 1976.

Release and reception

Scorpio was released in April 1977 on MCA Records. The album was issued as a vinyl LP, with five songs on each side of the record. The album spent nine weeks on the Billboard Top Country Albums chart before peaking at number 21 in June 1977. Scorpio produced two singles that became major hits. The first was the opening track "Head to Toe". Released as a single in March 1977, it became a major hit on the Billboard Hot Country Songs chart after peaking at number seven in June. The song also became a major hit on the RPM Country Singles chart after it reached number four.

A cover of "Still the One" was the second single released from the album. Issued in October 1977, the single peaked at number 11 on the Billboard country chart. In Canada, the song reached number 13 on the RPM chart. In its May issue, Billboard magazine gave Scorpio a positive review, praising the hit "Head to Toe". Writers also critiqued the album as a whole. "Kicked off the by the singer's new single, 'Head to Toe', which is currently leaping up the charts after two weeks, this album is an exceptional effort for Anderson," they wrote.

Track listing

Personnel
All credits are adapted from the liner notes of Scorpio.

Musical personnel

 Bill Anderson – lead vocals
 Eddy Anderson – drums
 Martin Chantry – strings
 Roy Christensen – strings
 James Colvard – guitar
 Bobby Emmons – piano, organ
 Carol Gorodetzky – strings
 The Holladays – background vocals
 The Jordanaires – background vocals
 Martin Katahn – strings
 Dave Kirby – guitar

 Sheldon Kurland – strings
 Larry Londin – drums
 The Nashville Edition – background vocals
 Billy Sanford – guitar
 Jack Smith – steel guitar
 Donald Teal – strings
 Gary Vanosdale – strings
 Dennis Wilson – bass
 Bobby Wood – piano, organ
 Woody Woodard – piano, organ
 Reggie Young – guitar

Technical personnel
 Larry Boden – engineering, mastering
 David Hogan – design and cover
 Buddy Killen – producer
 Jim McGuire – photography
 Ernie Winfrey – engineering

Chart performance

Release history

References

1977 albums
Bill Anderson (singer) albums
MCA Records albums